George, Prince of Wales  may refer to:

George II of Great Britain, from his creation as Prince of Wales in 1714 to his accession to the throne in 1727
George III of the United Kingdom, from his creation as Prince of Wales in 1751 until his accession to the throne in 1760
George IV of the United Kingdom, from his creation as Prince of Wales in 1762 until his accession to the throne in 1820
George V of the United Kingdom, from his creation as Prince of Wales in 1901 until his accession to the throne in 1910

Prince George of Wales may refer to:
Prince George William of Great Britain between 1717 and 1718
George III between 1738 and 1751
George V between 1865 and 1892
Prince George, Duke of Kent between 1902 and 1910
Prince George Alexander Louis since 2022

See also
 George Wales (disambiguation)